Onslow College is a state co-educational secondary school located in Johnsonville, a suburb of Wellington, New Zealand. It had a student population in 2020 of 1250 students.  The current principal is Sheena Millar.

History
Onslow College opened in 1956 to serve Wellington's rapidly growing northern suburbs. It was named after the 4th Earl of Onslow, governor of New Zealand from 1889 to 1892.

The school roll grew from 201 third form pupils in 1956 to 1180 pupils in 1969.

The "Onslow Way" is difficult to define but a former principal Stuart Martin described it as "socially liberal but educationally conservative, decile 10 but physically run down". In 1969, Peggy-Anne Wendelken became New Zealand's first woman chair of a school board of governors; at this time Onslow's board had student representation, twenty years before this became a legal requirement.

The school has not had a school uniform since 1974 when it was abolished following student protest, despite the strong opposition of the Headmaster. In 2016 Onslow was one of the first schools in the region to have gender-neutral toilets for students.

Several staff have received awards for teaching excellence. Terry Burrell, received the prestigious Prime Minister's Science Teacher Prize in 2014, and the same year Esme Danielsen (Maths) received a Woolf Fisher Fellowship.

Onslow students won The Prime Minister's Future Scientist Prize in 2009, 2016 and 2018.

Music – Smokefree Rockquest Wellington regional finalists in 2021 were Obsidian Sun. In 2016 Onslow College bands and individuals took out 5 of the 8 awards the Regional Final: Best Vocalist – Raquel Abolins-Reid, Musicianship Award – Noah Spargo, Best Lyricist – Sarah Mc Bride, 3rd placed band – Bird on a Wire, 1st placed band and overall winners of the Wellington Regional Final – Retrospect.

In 2017 Onslow College won the Wellington regional  "Festival Cup" for the school best representing the spirit of the Big Sing, a school choral festival organised by the New Zealand Choral Federation.

On 13 February 1997, 18-year-old former student Nicholas Hawker murdered 15-year-old St Mary's College student Vanessa Woodman on the school's grounds. Woodman was strangled, had her throat slit, and was stabbed 32 times. Hawker was sentenced to life imprisonment with a 10-year non-parole period. He was released on parole in 2015, but is not allowed in the North Island.

School principals 
The school has had the following principals:

 2018 – present Sheena Millar
 2010–2018 Peter Leggat
 2009-2009 Hamish Davidson (acting)
 2001–2009 Dr Stuart Martin
 1998–2000 Peter Smith
 1994–1998 John Carlyon
 1987–1993 Neale Pitches
 1979–1986 Bill Officer
 1977–1979 Harvey Rees-Thomas
 1966–1977 Dudley Hughes
 1956–1965 Colin Watt

Notable alumni

Academia 
 James Belich – Professor of History and writer
 Mary Morgan-Richards – Professor of Wildlife evolution

The Arts 
 Jackie van Beek – film and television director, writer and actor
John McDougall – guitarist-songwriter (The Holidaymakers)
Fazerdaze - singer-songwriter
Kate Camp – poet and author
Nick Bollinger – musician (Rough Justice, Windy City Strugglers), music critic and author
 Peter Marshall – singer  (The Holidaymakers)
Rosemary McLeod – writer
Sue Wootton – award-winning author
 Taika Waititi – film director and actor. Academy award winner.

Broadcasting and journalism 
 Ian Wishart – editor Investigate magazine
 Rocky Wood – non-fiction author and freelance journalist
Warwick Slow – radio DJ

Public service 
 Catherine Delahunty – Green Party MP
Georgina Beyer – the world's first transgender mayor and later member of parliament.
 Tāmati Coffey – Former TVNZ Breakfast weather presenter; Labour Party MP (2017–present)
 Trevor Mallard – former Labour Party MP and Speaker Of The House
 Sandra Lee-Vercoe – first Maori woman to win a general seat in Parliament

Sport 
 Alan Isaac – International Cricket Council President
Gavin Larsen – New Zealand cricket player
Jeremy Coney – New Zealand cricket player
Joe Wright – New Zealand Olympic Rower 2015
 Martin Dreyer – New Zealand Chess Champion
 Noah Billingsley – New Zealand football player
 Richard Ussher – New Zealand multisport athlete & World AR champion 2005/2006

Notable staff 
 Jeremy Coney – New Zealand cricket player
 Penny Kinsella – New Zealand cricket player
 Tina Manker – German Olympic rower

References

External links
 NZQA Provider Details – Onslow College
 School 50th Reunion website
 A Brief History of Onslow College
 

Educational institutions established in 1956
Secondary schools in the Wellington Region
Schools in Wellington City
1956 establishments in New Zealand